Ñusta Hispana Ñusta Ispanan (also written Ñusta Ispana), previously known as Chuquipalta (possibly from Quechua chuqi precious metal, p'allta plane) is an archaeological site in Peru. It is located at Vilcabamba, La Convención Province, Cusco Region.

A carved rock on the site is known as Yurac Rumi (White Rock).

Hiram Bingham III discovered the site on 9 Aug. 1911.  Bingham noted that the Augustinian monks Friar Marcos and Friar Diego, led their converted natives in burning down the Temple of the Sun, and scorching the rock itself, when Titu Cusi was absent.

Images

See also 
 Vitcos

References 

Archaeological sites in Peru
Archaeological sites in Cusco Region
1911 archaeological discoveries